Tricholomalides are neurotrophic diterpenoids isolated from the mushroom Tricholoma.

References

External links
Tricholomalide A at PubChem
Tricholomalide B at PubChem

Diterpenes
Cyclopentanes